Ángelo Ademir Campos Turriate (born April 27th, 1993) is a Peruvian professional footballer who plays for Club Alianza Lima as a goalkeeper.

Club career 

 Campos began his career with Alianza Lima. He spent the 2013 season on loan at San Alejandro.

 On July 1st, 2014, Campos was loaned to Club Deportivo Pacífico FC.
 When the 2014 season concluded, he then went to Alianza Universidad de Huanuco for the 2015-2016 season.
 After little to no appearances at Alianza Universidad, he transferred to Juan Aurich for the 2016-2017 season.
 After he discovered Juan Aurich wasn't a good fit, he returned to Alianza Lima for the 2017-2018 season, winning the Peruvian Primera Division championship with them.
 After being a free-agent for the 2018-2019 season, FBC Melgar had acquired Campos.
 Finally, Ángelo Ademir Campos Turriate returns for a 3rd time to his 1st club: Club Alianza Lima.

International career 
Campos competed for the Peru under-20 team at the 2013 South American Youth Championship.

References 

1993 births
Living people
Footballers from Lima
Peruvian footballers
Peru international footballers
Association football goalkeepers
Peru under-20 international footballers
FBC Melgar footballers